CityNightLine AG (timetable and platform sign abbreviation: CNL) was a Swiss night train service. CNL had right of passage grants in Germany, the Netherlands, Austria, Switzerland and Denmark. It served stations in Belgium, France, Italy and the Czech Republic.

History

CityNightLine AG was a joint project/creation undertaken by the Deutsche Bahn (DB) (German Federal Railways), the Austrian Federal Railways (ÖBB) and the Swiss Federal Railways (SBB-CFF-FFS).  CityNightLine's first train  departed on 28 May 1995. SBB-CFF-FFS and ÖBB have since ended their collaboration with CNL. As the predecessor joint CityNightLine company the new daughter company of DB is incorporated under Swiss law, based in Zurich.

CityNightLine was acquired by Deutsche Bahn AG in 2007 and merged with DB NachtZug to form the  "City Night Line" which until 2016 offered night services in former CityNightLine and NachtZug territories, of which includes the majority of CityNightLine's operations at the time of the merger. At the end of 2016, CityNightLine stopped operating, carriages were sold to the Austrian Railways which extended their night train network under the brand Nightjet. Nightjet trains still connect Munich, Vienna, Zurich, Hamburg, Cologne, Berlin, Milan, Rome and other cities.

See also
Nederlandse Spoorwegen
List of Swiss companies
Train categories in Europe

References

External links

Official website

Night trains
Rail transport in Europe
Passenger rail transport in Switzerland
Passenger rail transport in Germany
Passenger rail transport in the Netherlands
Passenger rail transport in Denmark